Lewis Hamilton (born 1985) is a British Formula One racing driver. 

Lewis or Louis Hamilton may also refer to:

People
Lewis Hamilton (priest), Archdeacon of Elphin in the 18th century
Louis McLane Hamilton (1844–1868), U.S. cavalry officer in the Civil War and American Indian Wars
Louis McLane Hamilton (lieutenant) (1876–1911), U.S. Army officer in the Spanish–American War
Louis Keppel Hamilton (1890–1957), senior Royal Navy officer
Lewis Hamilton (footballer) (born 1984), English footballer

Other uses
Lewis Hamilton (Cars), a character in Cars 2
Lewis Hamilton: Secret Life, an alternate reality game
SS Lewis Hamilton, a cargo ship built in 1945 and destroyed in 1971